Chie Ikeya is a historian of Southeast Asia. She is Associate Professor of Asian and women's and gender history in the Department of History at Rutgers University.

Ikeya's first book – a monograph on 'women, colonialism and modernity' in colonial Burma – was well-received. One reviewer called it "one of the most important books on colonial Burma to have emerged in the last century". Other reviewers called it a "social historical masterpiece", a "wonderful book", a "sophisticated, nuanced work", and an "excellent book". Another reviewer, despite specific criticisms, welcomed "an important and distinctive contribution [...] original, lucid and well researched".

Books
 Refiguring women, colonialism, and modernity in Burma. Honolulu: University of Hawaiʻi Press, 2011.
 (ed. with Lyn Parker and Laura Dales) Contestations Over Gender in Asia. Routledge, 2017.

References

Year of birth missing (living people)
Living people
Historians of Southeast Asia
Women's historians
Rutgers University faculty